Ender David Inciarte Montiel (born October 29, 1990) is a Venezuelan professional baseball outfielder who is a free agent. He has played in Major League Baseball for the Arizona Diamondbacks, Atlanta Braves and New York Mets. He made his MLB debut in 2014. He won the Fielding Bible Award in 2015, won the Gold Glove Award three times (2016–2018), and was an All-Star in 2017.

Career

Arizona Diamondbacks
Inciarte signed as an international free agent with the Diamondbacks on May 25, 2008, and began his career in Rookie Ball in 2008 with the Arizona League Diamondbacks. During the 2012 season, he hit .307 with two home runs, 47 runs batted in, and 28 stolen bases while splitting time between the Class-A South Bend Silver Hawks and the Class-A Advanced Visalia Rawhide.

Following the 2012 season, Arizona decided to not protect Inciarte on their 40-man roster and he was subsequently selected by the Philadelphia Phillies with the 15th pick in the Rule 5 draft. He competed for a spot with the Phillies as a backup outfielder during spring training, and ultimately made their 2013 Opening Day roster. Following the first game of the season, Inciarte was designated for assignment without making an appearance to make room for the acquisition of Ezequiel Carrera on April 2. He was offered back to the Diamondbacks and was assigned to the Mobile BayBears of the Class AA Southern League. With Mobile, Inciarte had a .281 batting average, five home runs, 17 doubles, 25 runs batted in, and 43 stolen bases. He appeared in the Southern League All-Star Game. After the season, the Diamondbacks added Inciarte to their 40-man roster.

Inciarte began the 2014 season with the Reno Aces of the Class AAA Pacific Coast League. He batted .312 with two home runs and seven stolen bases in 109 at-bats before being promoted to the major leagues. He made his major league debut on May 2, 2014, and recorded a hit in his first major league game. He hit his first major league home run on July 5 off of Aaron Harang of the Atlanta Braves. Inciarte batted .303 with 21 stolen bases for the Diamondbacks in 2015. After the 2015 season, Inciarte won the Fielding Bible Award for players who played multiple positions.

Atlanta Braves
On December 9, 2015, the Diamondbacks traded Inciarte, Dansby Swanson, and Aaron Blair to the Braves for Shelby Miller, and Gabe Speier. Inciarte started for the Braves as their center fielder and leadoff hitter on Opening Day. The Braves placed Inciarte on the disabled list on April 11. He was reactivated on May 6. The time he missed negatively impacted Inciarte's offensive production, as he recorded a .227 batting average in the first half of the season. After the All-Star break, Inciarte's hitting improved. He finished the year with a .291 batting average, coupled with three career-best marks, a .351 on-base percentage, a .381 slugging percentage, 85 runs scored, and seven triples. In 131 games, Inciarte also stole 16 bases. Though he finished behind Billy Hamilton in defensive Wins Above Replacement (as tabulated by Fangraphs), Ultimate Zone Rating, and Defensive Runs Saved, Inciarte won the 2016 National League Gold Glove for center fielders due to his superior arm strength and accuracy. On December 23, 2016, the Atlanta Braves announced that Inciarte had been signed to a five-year extension worth approximately $30 million.

On April 14, 2017, Inciarte recorded the first defensive out, first hit, and first home run at the Braves' new venue, SunTrust Park. The Braves won 5–2 over the San Diego Padres. On May 22, 2017, Inciarte recorded his first career five-hit game against the Pittsburgh Pirates in a 5–2 Braves victory. Weeks later, on June 4, 2017, Inciarte recorded his second five-hit performance, as well as his first 5-RBI game in a 13–8 win against the Cincinnati Reds. He was the only Brave selected to the 2017 Major League Baseball All-Star Game. Inciarte hit two home runs and stole two bases against the Colorado Rockies on August 17, 2017, becoming only the 17th player—and third Brave—to have a multi-homer, multi-steal game since 1901. He recorded his first 200-hit season on September 26, with a double in the first inning against the New York Mets. At the end of the year, Inciarte won the National League Rawlings Gold Glove Award for center fielders for the second time in his career.
In 2018, Inciarte's defense in center field continued to impress en route to his third consecutive Gold Glove award. He hit .265/.325/.380 with ten home runs, 61 RBIs, and 28 stolen bases.

In 2019, injuries to his torso and hamstring limited Inciarte to 65 games. He hit .246/.343/.397 with 5 home runs and 24 RBIs in 199 at bats.

In 2020 he batted .190/.262/.250 with 17 runs, one home run, and 10 RBIs in 116 at bats. He had the lowest average exit velocity of any major league batter, at 78.2 mph, and the lowest percentage of hard hit balls, at 6.4%.

In 79 at-bats in 2021 for the Braves, Inciarte hit .215 with 2 home runs and 10 RBI's, missing time with a strained hamstring and a COVID-19 injured list stint. On July 24, 2021, Inciarte was designated for assignment by the Braves. On July 29, Inciarte was released by the Braves.

Cincinnati Reds
On August 5, 2021, Inciarte signed a minor league deal with the Cincinnati Reds. He was assigned to the Triple-A Louisville Bats. Inciarte made 15 appearances for Triple-A Louisville, hitting .288 with no home runs and 7 RBI's. On August 28, 2021, Inciarte was released by the Reds.

New York Yankees
On December 16, 2021, Inciarte signed a minor league contract with the New York Yankees. Inciarte played in 34 games for the Triple-A Scranton/Wilkes-Barre Railriders, hitting .252 with 4 home runs and 11 RBI's. On June 15, 2022, Inciarte was released by the Yankees.

New York Mets
On June 20, 2022, Inciarte signed a minor league contract with the New York Mets. On June 28, the Mets selected Inciarte's contract and added him to the Major League active roster. He was designated for assignment on July 14, 2022. He cleared waivers and was sent outright to the Triple-A Syracuse Mets on July 18. However, the next day he rejected the outright assignment and elected free agency.

Personal life
Inciarte's father, Astolfo, played baseball in Venezuela. His brother, also named Astolfo, played in the minor leagues for the Diamondbacks organization, until their father died and he returned home to take over the family business. He is also a Real Madrid football club supporter. Inciarte played in the 2017 World Baseball Classic, representing his native country of Venezuela.
In December 2020, Inciarte and Miss Universe 2009 winner Stefanía Fernández announced their relationship. Five months later, in May 2021, the couple welcomed their first child, a son.

See also

 List of Major League Baseball players from Venezuela

References

External links

Ender Inciarte at Pura Pelota (Venezuelan Professional Baseball League)

1990 births
Living people
Águilas del Zulia players
Arizona Diamondbacks players
Atlanta Braves players
Dominican Summer League Diamondbacks/Reds players
Venezuelan expatriate baseball players in the Dominican Republic
Gold Glove Award winners
Major League Baseball outfielders
Major League Baseball players from Venezuela
Missoula Osprey players
Mobile BayBears players
National League All-Stars
New York Mets players
Reno Aces players
South Bend Silver Hawks players
Sportspeople from Maracaibo
Venezuelan expatriate baseball players in the United States
Visalia Rawhide players
World Baseball Classic players of Venezuela
Yakima Bears players
2017 World Baseball Classic players
Scranton/Wilkes-Barre RailRiders players
Syracuse Mets players